The 2004 Algerian Cup Final was the 40th final of the Algerian Cup. The final took place on June 25, 2004, at Stade 5 Juillet 1962 in Algiers with kick-off at 17:00. USM Alger beat JS Kabylie 5–4 on penalties.

Algerian Ligue Professionnelle 1 clubs JS Kabylie and USM Alger will contest the final, in what will be the 42nd edition of the Kabylo-Algiers Derby. The competition winners are awarded a berth in the 2005 CAF Confederation Cup.

Route to the final

Pre-match

Details

External links
 Coupe d'Algérie 2004
 2003/04 Coupe Nationale

References

Cup
Algeria
Algerian Cup Finals
USM Alger matches